Leonard Anthony Boyle (30 November 1930 – 1 June 2016) was a New Zealand bishop. He was the fifth Catholic Bishop of Dunedin from 1985 to 2005.

Boyle was born in Nightcaps, Southland, New Zealand, on 30 November 1930 and was educated at Sisters of Mercy convent schools in Nightcaps and Winton. He received his secondary education at St Kevin's College, Oamaru, before training for ordination at Holy Name Seminary in Christchurch and Holy Cross College in Mosgiel. He was ordained as a priest in Winton on 30 June 1961. He held appointments as curate at St Patrick's Basilica, South Dunedin (1961–1964) (where he encouraged the novena devotions) and Georgetown, Invercargill (1964–1970). He was parish priest in South Dunedin (1970–1972) and at St. Mary's Basilica, Invercargill (1972–1983). He was appointed coadjutor bishop for the Dunedin diocese on 27 January 1983 and was ordained as a bishop at Dunedin's town hall on 3 May 1983. He succeeded to the see on the death of his predecessor, John Kavanagh, on 10 July 1985. Boyle retired on 24 May 2004. He was succeeded by Colin Campbell.

References

External links
 The Catholic Church in Aotearoa New Zealand, Most Reverend Leonard Boyle (Retrieved 18 January 2011)
  Bishop Leonard Anthony Boyle, Catholic Hierarchy website (Retrieved 18 January 2011) 

1930 births
2016 deaths
21st-century Roman Catholic bishops in New Zealand
20th-century Roman Catholic bishops in New Zealand
People educated at St Kevin's College, Oamaru
People from Nightcaps, New Zealand
Roman Catholic bishops of Dunedin
Holy Name Seminary alumni
Holy Cross College, New Zealand alumni